Thomas Wegmüller (born 28 September 1960) is a former Swiss racing cyclist. He rode in the Tour de France, the Vuelta a España, won a stage in the 1989 Critérium du Dauphiné Libéré and was named the Most Combative rider on the Champs-Élysées stage during the 1990 Tour de France. He was the Swiss National Road Race champion in 1992.

Major results

1987
 1st GP Lugano
 1st Kaistenberg Rundfahrt
 1st Stage 6 GP Tell
 2nd Tour du Nord-Ouest
 3rd Grand Prix de Mauléon-Moulins
1988
 1st Stage 5 Tour of Britain
 2nd Paris–Roubaix
 5th Grand Prix des Nations
 7th GP Ouest France-Plouay
1989
 1st Grand Prix de Wallonie
 1st Stage 2 Critérium du Dauphiné Libéré
 2nd Grand Prix des Nations
 2nd Tour du Nord-Ouest
 3rd Overall Tour of Ireland
 5th GP Ouest France-Plouay
 5th Wartenberg Rundfahrt
1990
 1st Grand Prix des Nations
 1st Kaistenberg Rundfahrt
 1st Tour du Nord-Ouest
 2nd GP des Amériques
 3rd GP Ouest France-Plouay
 3rd Tre Valli Varesine
 7th Paris–Roubaix
 9th Giro di Lombardia
1991
 1st Stage 4 Vuelta Asturias
 3rd Grand Prix des Nations
 4th Overall Tirreno–Adriatico
 4th GP Ouest France-Plouay
 8th Overall Étoile de Bessèges
1992
 1st  Road race, National Road Championships
 1st Stage 3 Clásico RCN
 2nd Tour of Flanders
 2nd Tre Valli Varesine
 5th Grand Prix des Nations
1993
 1st Stage 3 Volta a Portugal
 7th Japan Cup Cycle Road Race

Grand Tour general classification results timeline

References

External links

1960 births
Living people
Swiss male cyclists
Cyclists from Bern